Vulsella may refer to:

Vulsella (bivalve), a genus of bivalves in the family Malleidae
Vulsellum, a type of forceps